Popular Favorites by Stan Kenton is a compilation album by pianist and bandleader Stan Kenton featuring performances recorded between 1951 and 1953 and originally released as a 10-inch LP and 45 rpm EP on Capitol before being reissued as a 12-inch LP with additional tracks in 1955.

Critical reception

The Allmusic review by Richard S. Ginell said "This early-LP collection partially documents a period of retrenching after Kenton's Innovations in Modern Music Orchestra took a financial bath. While the album concentrates upon pop standards and an occasional cover of a then-current hit, Capitol also adds some originals from the artist's book, and thus the record becomes a tasty cross-section of the Kenton bands of the early '50s".

Track listing
 "September Song" (Kurt Weill, Maxwell Anderson) – 3:21
 "Delicado" (Valdir Azevedo, Jack Lawrence) – 2:26
 "Dynaflow" (Art Pepper, Stan Kenton) – 3:08
 "Love for Sale" (Cole Porter) – 3:13
 "Beehive" (Gene Roland) – 3:06
 "Francesca" (Sherm Feller) – 2:45
 "Tenderly" (Walter Gross, Jack Lawrence) – 3:19
 "Jump for Joe" (Roland) – 3:04
 "Harlem Nocturne" (Earle Hagen) – 3:08
 "Taboo" (Margarita Lecuona) – 3:21
 "Laura" (David Raksin, Johnny Mercer) – 3:20
 "Stardust" (Hoagy Carmichael, Mitchell Parish) – 3:00
Recorded at Capitol Recording Studios in Hollywood, CA on September 12, 1950 (track 4), March 20, 1951 (track 1), March 28, 1951 (track 3), May 28, 1951 (track 11), May 31, 1951 (track 8), June 28, 1951 (track 6), January 21, 1952 (track 7), March 18, 1952 (track 12), March 20, 1952 (tracks 2 & 5), September 11, 1952 (track 10) and January 22, 1953 (track 9)

Personnel
Stan Kenton – piano, conductor
Alfred "Chico" Alvarez, (tracks 1, 3, 4, 6, 8 & 11), Conte Candoli (tracks 2, 5, 7, 9, 10 & 12), Pete Candoli (track 7), Buddy Childers (tracks 2, 5, 6, 9, 10 & 12), Don Dennis (tracks 2, 5, 9, 10 & 12), Maynard Ferguson (tracks 1, 3, 4 & 6- 11), John Howell (tracks 1, 3, 4, 6, 8 & 11), Ruben McFall (tracks 2, 5, 9, 10 & 12), Jerry Munson (track 7), Al Porcino (track 4), Clyde Raesinger (tracks 2, 5, 7 & 12), Shorty Rogers (tracks 1, 3, 4, 6, 8 & 11), Jimmy Salko (tracks 8 & 11), Ray Wetzel (tracks 1 & 3) – trumpet
Milt Bernhart (tracks 1, 3, 4, 6, 8 & 11), Eddie Bert (track 4), Harry Betts (tracks 1, 3, 4, 6–8 & 11), Harold Branch (tracks 2 & 5), Bob Burgess (tracks 9 & 10), Gerald Finch (tracks 2, 5, 7 & 12), Bob Fitzpatrick (tracks 1–8, 11 & 12), Dick Kenney (tracks 1, 3, 6–8 & 11), Keith Moon (tracks 9 & 10), Frank Rosolino (tracks 9 & 10), Bill Russo (tracks 2 5, 9, 10 & 12) – trombone 
John Halliburton – trombone, bass trombone (tracks 1, 3, 6 & 12)
George Roberts (tracks 2, 5, 7, 9, 10 & 12), Bart Varsalona (track 4), Paul Weigand (tracks 8 & 11) – bass trombone
John Graas – French horn (track 7)
Vinnie Dean (tracks 9 & 10), Lee Konitz (tracks 9 & 10), Dick Meldonian (track 2, 5, 7 & 12), Lennie Niehaus (tracks 2, 5 & 12), Art Pepper (tracks 1, 3, 4, 6, 8 & 11), Bud Shank (tracks 1, 3, 4, 6, 8 & 11), Herbie Steward (track 7) – alto saxophone
Bob Cooper (tracks 1, 3, 4, 6 & 7), Bart Caldarell (tracks 1, 3, 4, 6–8  & 11), Lee Elliot (tracks 2, 5 & 12), Jimmy Giuffre (track 8 & 11), Bill Holman (tracks 2, 5, 9, 10 & 12), Richie Kamuca (tracks 9 & 10)  – tenor saxophone
Bob Gioga – baritone saxophone
Ralph Blaze (tracks 1–8, 11 & 12), Sal Salvador (tracks 9 & 10) – guitar
Laurindo Almeida – guitar, cabasa (track 2)
Don Bagley – bass
Frank Capp (tracks 2, 5 & 12), Stan Levey (tracks 9 & 10), Shelly Manne (tracks 1, 3, 4, 6–8 & 11) – drums
Ramon Rivera – congas (track 4) 
Ken Walton – bongos (track 10)
Vocals by band (tracks 1, 7 & 11) 
Stan Kenton (tracks 1, 3, 7 & 11), Gene Roland (tracks 5, 8 & 10), Pete Rugolo (track 2, 4, 6, & 12), Bill Russo (track 9) – arranger

References

Stan Kenton albums
1953 albums
Capitol Records albums
Albums arranged by Bill Russo
Albums arranged by Pete Rugolo
Albums conducted by Stan Kenton
Albums produced by Lee Gillette